The miaodao (苗刀) is a Chinese two-handed dao or saber of the Republican Era, with a narrow blade, long hilt, and an overall length of  or more. The name means "sprout saber", presumably referring to a likeness between the weapon and a newly sprouted plant. An early reference, in Jin Yiming’s Single Defense-Saber, makes a connection between the miaodao and the Qing-era wodao, as well as mentioning both single and two-handed versions of the ‘’miaodao’’, suggesting that the name originally described the shape only, without any connotations of size. While the miaodao is a recent weapon, the name has come to be applied to a variety of earlier Chinese long sabers, such as the zhanmadao and changdao. Along with the dadao, miaodao were used by some Chinese troops during the Second Sino-Japanese War.

While the miaodao is rarely practiced in modern Chinese martial arts, some schools of piguaquan and tongbeiquan (in the Guo Changsheng lineage) and xingyiquan train with the weapon. The miaodao is also often mistakenly claimed to have been one of the weapons taught at the Central Military Academy in Nanjing; the weapon in question was actually a European-style officer's saber, though some later schools may have based miaodao techniques on this form.

The "miao" of miaodao should not be confused with the Miao ethnic group, who are not associated with this weapon.

Gallery

See also
Chinese sword
Dao (Chinese sword)
Japanese sword
Katana

References
 Dekker, Peter (2016), “Chinese long sabers of the Qing dynasty”, Mandarin Mansion 
 Duan Ping (段平), Zheng Shouzhi (郑守志) et al. Wushu Cidian (武术词典) Wushu Dictionary. Renmin Tiyu Chubanshe, 2007. .
 Ma Mingda (马明达), Shuo jian cong gao (说剑丛稿),  .
 Rovere, Dennis with Chow Hon Huen (2008). The Xingyi Quan of the Chinese Army: Huang Bo Nien's Xingyi Fist and Weapon Instruction. Blue Snake Books. .
 Tom, Philip (February 2005). "An Introduction to Chinese Single-Edged Hilt Weapons (Dao) and Their Use in the Ming and Qing Dynasties". Kung Fu Tai Chi, p. 85.
 Jin Yiming (金一明) (1932), Single Defense-Saber (單戒刀), New Asia Press, translated by Paul Brennan 2015

External links
A comprehensive article about the miaodao
  https://web.archive.org/web/20081103074622/http://www.freewebs.com/jingangbashi/miaodaointro.htm

Blade weapons
Chinese swords
World War II infantry weapons of China